CareerArc Social Recruiting (formerly TweetMyJobs) is a social recruiting software company headquartered in Burbank, California. The company was founded in March 2009, and is a division of CareerArc Group. The company has offices in Burbank, California and Marlborough, Massachusetts. The platform provides a social recruiting system to connect job seekers with hiring employers.

History
The company was founded in 2009 as TweetMyJobs.

On November 7, 2011, TweetMyJobs launched a version of their platform designed for veterans as part of the Joining Forces initiative announced by President Barack Obama. Aneesh Chopra, the former CTO of the United States, wrote a blog post stating that "leaders in social media have joined the movement... Twitter, through TweetMyJobs, will reach millions of veterans through their networks."

TweetMyJobs’ government platform was announced on January 19, 2012 when the city of Atlanta, GA launched atlanta.tweetmyjobs.com to help Atlanta residents find work. Subsequently, the government platform was launched in Newark, NJ, Houston, TX, Nassau County, NY, Ramapo, NY, Columbia, SC and the territory of Puerto Rico.

On July 23, 2015 the company announced it is rebranding as CareerArc Social Recruiting.

See also 
 Employment website

References

External links 

Employment websites in the United States
Companies based in Los Angeles
Online marketplaces of the United States